Vikalp Mehta is an Indian mimicry artist and performer from Pali, Rajasthan, India He is mainly known for lookalike of Akshay Kumar and doing his mimicry on various popular television comedy shows like India's Got Talent, Comedy Nights with Kapil, Entertainment Ke Liye Kuch Bhi Karega, Comedy Circus and The Great Indian Family Drama. He has also hosted a Life Ka Recharge LKR (TV series) comedy show on &tv which was produced by Sachin Mohite. He had also hosted 2016 UBA Pro Basketball League season and as a presenter that was his one of the best performances. Vikalp was also seen in the show Entertainment Ke Liye Kuch Bhi Karega on Sony TV in 2009. After performing at Entertainment ke live Such Bhi karega. Vikalp considers the Akshay Kumar as his inspiration and main reason for his tremendous success. In an Interview with ZEE News he said "I was an ardent fan of Akshay right from the beginning. In fact, I came all the way from Rajasthan to Mumbai and waited the whole day at Mehboob Studio just to click a photograph with him".

Early life and background 
Vikalp Mehta was born on 12 December 1989 in Pali to a Jain family. He is the eldest son of Government employee Sanjeev Mehta and Anita Mehta. Vikalp spent his childhood in Pali, Rajasthan. He did his schooling from Pali. He later earned bachelor's degree in Commerce from Maharshi Dayanand University. He also did diploma in event management. According to his father he is a born artist and very clear in his thoughts that what he wants to do. He is also very close to his family specially with his mother Anita Mehta.

Television

References

External links 
 

21st-century Indian male actors
Indian male television actors
Indian male film actors
Male actors in Hindi television
Male actors from Rajasthan
1989 births
Marwari people
Living people